Metropolitan Block may refer to:

Metropolitan Block (Lima, Ohio), listed on the National Register of Historic Places in Allen County, Ohio
Metropolitan Block (Lake Geneva, Wisconsin), listed on the National Register of Historic Places in Walworth County, Wisconsin